The 1977 BWF World Championships took place from May 3–8, 1977 in Malmö, Sweden. This was the inaugural edition of the World Championships with the joint top seeds being Liem Swie King and Flemming Delfs.

Main stage

Section 1

Section 2

Section 3

Section 4

Final stage

References

 http://newspapers.nl.sg/Digitised/Page/straitstimes19770505.1.22.aspx

1977 IBF World Championships